Jacquemontia is a genus of plants in the morning glory family Convolvulaceae. Species in this genus are commonly known as clustervine.

Species
Over one hundred species are recognised:

 Jacquemontia abutiloides  
 Jacquemontia acrocephala  
 Jacquemontia acuminata  
 Jacquemontia aequisepala  
 Jacquemontia albida  
 Jacquemontia anomala  
 Jacquemontia asarifolia  
 Jacquemontia bahiensis  
 Jacquemontia blanchetii  
 Jacquemontia bracteosa  
 Jacquemontia browniana  
 Jacquemontia capitellata  
 Jacquemontia cataractae  
 Jacquemontia caudata  
 Jacquemontia cayensis  
 Jacquemontia cearensis  
 Jacquemontia cephalantha  
 Jacquemontia chrysanthera  
 Jacquemontia confusa  
 Jacquemontia corymbulosa  
 Jacquemontia cumanensis  
 Jacquemontia curtissii  
 Jacquemontia cuyabana  
 Jacquemontia decipiens  
 Jacquemontia densiflora  
 Jacquemontia densifolia  
 Jacquemontia diamantinensis  
 Jacquemontia eastwoodiana  
 Jacquemontia ekmanii  
 Jacquemontia elegans  
 Jacquemontia estrellensis  
 Jacquemontia evolvuloides  
 Jacquemontia ferruginea  
 Jacquemontia floribunda  
 Jacquemontia frankeana  
 Jacquemontia fruticulosa  
 Jacquemontia fusca  
 Jacquemontia gabrielii  
 Jacquemontia glabrescens  
 Jacquemontia glaucescens  
 Jacquemontia gracilis  
 Jacquemontia gracillima  
 Jacquemontia grisea  
 Jacquemontia guaranitica  
 Jacquemontia guyanensis  
 Jacquemontia havanensis  
 Jacquemontia heterantha  
 Jacquemontia heterotricha  
 Jacquemontia holosericea  
 Jacquemontia itatiayensis  
 Jacquemontia lasioclados  
 Jacquemontia linarioides  
 Jacquemontia linoides  
 Jacquemontia lorentzii  
 Jacquemontia macrocalyx  
 Jacquemontia martii  
 Jacquemontia mexicana  
 Jacquemontia mucronifera  
 Jacquemontia multiflora  
 Jacquemontia nipensis  
 Jacquemontia nodiflora  
 Jacquemontia oaxacana  
 Jacquemontia obcordata   
 Jacquemontia ochracea  
 Jacquemontia ovalifolia  
 Jacquemontia paniculata  
 Jacquemontia pannosa  
 Jacquemontia paraguayensis  
 Jacquemontia parviflora  
 Jacquemontia parvifolia  
 Jacquemontia pentanthos  
 Jacquemontia peruviana  
 Jacquemontia pinetorum  
 Jacquemontia polyantha  
 Jacquemontia pringlei 
 Jacquemontia prostrata  
 Jacquemontia pycnocephala  
 Jacquemontia reclinata  
 Jacquemontia revoluta  
 Jacquemontia robertsoniana  
 Jacquemontia rojasiana  
 Jacquemontia rufa  
 Jacquemontia rusbyana  
 Jacquemontia sandwicensis  
 Jacquemontia saxicola  
 Jacquemontia selloi  
 Jacquemontia serpyllifolia  
 Jacquemontia solanifolia  
 Jacquemontia sphaerocephala  
 Jacquemontia sphaerostigma  
 Jacquemontia spiciflora  
 Jacquemontia staplesii  
 Jacquemontia subsessilis  
 Jacquemontia tamnifolia  
 Jacquemontia tomentella 
 Jacquemontia tuerckheimii  
 Jacquemontia turneroides  
 Jacquemontia unilateralis  
 Jacquemontia velloziana  
 Jacquemontia velutina  
 Jacquemontia verticillata  
 Jacquemontia villosissima  
 Jacquemontia warmingii  
 Jacquemontia weberbaueri 
 Jacquemontia zollingeri

References

Convolvulaceae
Convolvulaceae genera
Taxa named by Jacques Denys Choisy